Joseph L. Schofer  is an American civil engineer specializing in transportation engineering. He is Professor of Civil and Environmental Engineering, and Associate Dean at the Robert R. McCormick School of Engineering and Applied Science at Northwestern University in Evanston, Illinois, where he is also Director of the Infrastructure Technology Institute.  Schofer earned his B.E. from Yale University and an M.S. and Ph.D. from Northwestern University. He is actively engaged with the Transportation Research Board (TRB) of the National Research Council, chairing national policy studies on Equity Implications of Evolving Transportation Finance Mechanisms and Strategies for Improved Passenger and Freight Travel Data; serving on the Technical Advisory Committee on Capacity for the Strategic Highway Research Program.

He has been on the Northwestern University faculty since 1970, serving as chairman of the department from 1997 to 2002, and as Interim Dean of the McCormick School during 2004-2005. His research and teaching are in transportation policy planning, analysis, evaluation, and behavior. He has published over 130 articles and book chapters and more than 50 technical reports. He received the 2011 Roy W. Crum Distinguished Service Award from the Transportation Research Board.

Schofer co-hosts a podcast - the Infrastructure Show for which he interviews infrastructure experts and posts news stories about infrastructure on a monthly basis.  He is a member of the Institute of Transportation Engineers and a life Member of the American Society of Civil Engineers.

References

External links
 Professor Schofer’s website
 Infrastructure Technology Institute
 Infrastructure Show

American civil engineers
21st-century American engineers
Transport engineers
Northwestern University faculty
Yale University alumni
Robert R. McCormick School of Engineering and Applied Science alumni
Living people
Year of birth missing (living people)